Bhusyah (Nepal Bhasa: भूस्याः) is a pair of metallic cymbals. Technically, these are idiophones. This instrument is played with Dhimay or other membranophones. Its size ranges from around 10 to 21 inches (25 to 53 cm).

Festivals
Festivals in which Bhusya are played are as follows-
Bisket Jatra
Yenya punhi
Janamaadya rath jatra
Bungdya rath jatra

References

Newar
Cymbals of Nepal